The 1969–70 A Group was the 22nd season of the A Football Group, the top Bulgarian professional league for association football clubs, since its establishment in 1948.

Overview
It was contested by 16 teams, and Levski Sofia won the championship.

League standings

Results

Champions
Levski Sofia

Top scorers

References

External links
Bulgaria - List of final tables (RSSSF)
1969–70 Statistics of A Group at a-pfg.com

First Professional Football League (Bulgaria) seasons
Bulgaria
1969–70 in Bulgarian football